The Australian Services cricket team which had played in England in 1945 went home via India and Ceylon, playing further first-class matches in both countries.

The Services team was captained by Lindsay Hassett and included other notable players in Keith Miller and Cec Pepper.

The team arrived in India during October and played eight matches in India. They played a Prince's XI, four zone teams and three matches against an Indian XI. These three games were played, respectively, at Brabourne Stadium in Bombay; Eden Gardens in Calcutta; and M. A. Chidambaram Stadium in Madras. The first two were drawn and the Indian XI won the third by 6 wickets.

The Services team moved on to Ceylon in December and played one first-class match versus Ceylon at the Paikiasothy Saravanamuttu Stadium in Colombo. Australian Services won by an innings and 44 runs, largely thanks to a century by Miller.

Arriving back in Australia shortly before Christmas, the team continued its tour by playing against each of the Australian state teams, ending with a game against Tasmania in Hobart at the end of January 1946.

See also
 Australian Services cricket team in England in 1945

References

External links
 India itinerary
 Ceylon itinerary

Further reading
 Mihir Bose, A History of Indian Cricket, Andre-Deutsch, 1990
 Ramachandra Guha, A Corner of a Foreign Field - An Indian History of a British Sport, Picador, 2001
 Wisden Cricketers Almanack 1946

1945 in Australian cricket
1945 in Ceylon
1945 in Indian cricket
1946 in Australian cricket
Australian cricket tours of India
Australian cricket tours of Sri Lanka
Indian cricket seasons from 1945–46 to 1969–70
International cricket competitions from 1945–46 to 1960
Sri Lankan cricket seasons from 1880–81 to 1971–72